Peter Henkes (born 27 July 1962) is a German former professional footballer who played as a midfielder.

Career
Henkes was capped 24 times for FSV Salmrohr in 1986–87 2. Bundesliga season. He won the 1989–90 German amateur football championship with FSV Salmrohr.

References

External links
 

1962 births
Living people
German footballers
2. Bundesliga players
Association football midfielders
FSV Salmrohr players